Roberto Teixeira da Fonseca (born 3 May 1962), known as Roberto Fonseca, is a Brazilian football manager and former player who played as a central defender.

Career
Born in Mandaguari, began his professional career at Londrina in 1981. Later he played for the teams: São Paulo, América-SP, Catanduvense, Botafogo de Ribeirão Preto, Barretos, Bahia, Sãocarlense, Ferroviária, Grêmio Maringá, Moto Club and Portuguesa Londrinense, where he finished his career in 1999.

He has been working as a coach since 2003. He was Oeste. Later, managed Botafogo de Ribeirão Preto, Francana, Barretos, XV de Piracicaba, Mirassol, Sertãozinho, Bandeirante, Londrina, São Bento, CENE, ADAP, São Raimundo de Santarem, Ituiutaba, Guaratinguetá e Rio Branco de Americana.

In 2008 commanded the Oeste in campaign which led the club back to main series of Campeonato Paulista, in 2010, commanded the São Caetano was hired by Botafogo de Ribeirão Preto. returned in Guaratinguetá and Botafogo de Ribeirão Preto. in 2011 was the coach of Caldense should help and on 6 June of the same year, was announced new technician of Paraná and at the end of 2011 in commanded Itumbiara. was hired in February 2012, as trainer of Ituano and lent in the CRB returning to the command of the Ituano, in the following year. being that in June of that same year with the Brasiliense.

Roberto with the São Bernardo command team in the remainder of the Campeonato Paulista, with the difficult mission to rid the team of the downgrade, where he achieved with success the objective. months after, was Botafogo da Paraíba. On 20 July 2015, Roberto da Fonseca and his auxiliary left the command of the paraibana team in 11 games by summing the final stage of Campeonato Paraibano and Campeonato Brasileiro Série C, with utilization of 48.4% of the games. On 2 July 2015, was confirmed by the directors of São Bernardo would be the new coach of the team at Paulistão 2016. Fonseca has delivered the tiger on the downgrade the Serie A1 of state championship. On 26 February 2016, Roberto Fonseca terminates with the São Bernardo, the club is near the downgrade zone.

Hit with the in Oeste dispute of Série B, where left due to recasting of the inside of the team. but in July 2016, with the Cuiabá.

Honours

Player 
 Londrina
 Campeonato Paranaense: 1982

 São Paulo
 Campeonato Paulista: 1985

Manager 
 Oeste
 Campeonato Paulista Série A2: 2003

 CRB
 Campeonato Alagoano: 2012

 Cuiabá
 Campeonato Mato-Grossense: 2017

 Sampaio Corrêa 
 Copa do Nordeste: 2018

References

1962 births
Living people
Sportspeople from Paraná (state)
Brazilian footballers
Association football defenders
Brazilian football managers
Campeonato Brasileiro Série B managers
Campeonato Brasileiro Série C managers
Londrina Esporte Clube players
São Paulo FC players
América Futebol Clube (SP) players
Grêmio Catanduvense de Futebol players
Barretos Esporte Clube players
Esporte Clube Bahia players
Grêmio Esportivo Sãocarlense players
Associação Ferroviária de Esportes players
Grêmio de Esportes Maringá players
Moto Club de São Luís players
Associação Portuguesa Londrinense players
Oeste Futebol Clube managers
Botafogo Futebol Clube (SP) managers
Associação Atlética Francana managers
Esporte Clube XV de Novembro (Piracicaba) managers
Mirassol Futebol Clube managers
Sertãozinho Futebol Clube managers
Londrina Esporte Clube managers
Esporte Clube São Bento managers
Boa Esporte Clube managers
Guaratinguetá Futebol managers
Rio Branco Esporte Clube managers
Criciúma Esporte Clube managers
América Futebol Clube (RN) managers
Associação Desportiva São Caetano managers
Associação Atlética Caldense managers
Paraná Clube managers
Itumbiara Esporte Clube managers
Ituano FC managers
Clube de Regatas Brasil managers
Brasiliense Futebol Clube managers
Esporte Clube Santo André managers
Clube Atlético Linense managers
ABC Futebol Clube managers
São Bernardo Futebol Clube managers
Botafogo Futebol Clube (PB) managers
Cuiabá Esporte Clube managers
Clube Atlético Bragantino managers
Sampaio Corrêa Futebol Clube managers
Grêmio Novorizontino managers
Guarani FC managers
Paysandu Sport Club managers
Ferroviário Atlético Clube (CE) managers
Centro Sportivo Alagoano managers